Gopal Parajuli (born 28 April 1953) was the former and 27th chief Justice of Nepal. He was born in Tanahun, Nepal. Inconsistencies in his birth date due to multiple records showing multiple dates led to his removal on 14 March 2018 by the Judicial Council citing he should have retired on 5 August 2017. Even after his dismissal, he resigned from his post to the President on 15 March 2018.

Career 
He was born on Tanahun, Nepal.

Date of birth controversy
Four different date of births have surfaced and he reversed the decision made by previous Chief Justice Sushila Karki to extend his tenure as Chief Justice

Professional career

References

External links 

20th-century Nepalese judges
Living people
1953 births
People from Tanahun District
Chief justices of Nepal
Nepal Law Campus alumni
21st-century Nepalese judges